The Duterte fist (or Duterte fist bump) is a hand gesture made by raising a clenched fist at chest or eye level. The gesture serves as a signature political symbol of Philippine president Rodrigo Duterte, his administration and allies, and his supporters.

Usage

During meetings with Duterte, some visitors and personalities would often pose for photos with Duterte doing the signature fist gesture; these included Chinese actor Jackie Chan, Chinese tycoon Jack Ma, Hollywood actor Steven Seagall, and Japanese Prime Minister Shinzo Abe. 

Some critics of Duterte view the fist gesture to represent Duterte's War on Drugs. During his visit to the Philippines in 2017, Australian spy chief Nick Warner has been criticized for doing the fist gesture alongside Duterte in a photo shoot; US President Donald Trump was also warned from doing the gesture during his planned trip to the Philippines later that year. Supreme Court Associate Justice Rodil Zalameda in 2019 was also criticized for doing the gesture moments after being appointed by Duterte over concerns of independence of the judiciary from the executive department.

The Duterte fist was included in the new logo of Duterte's party, PDP-Laban, as part of the party's rebranding of itself in Duterte's image since 2016.

Online use
The Fisted Hand Sign Emoji has been used to represent the gesture in social media.

Gallery

References

External links
 

Rodrigo Duterte
Hand gestures
Political symbols